Patrick James "Paddy" Quinn (August 1849 – January 2, 1909) was an American Major League Baseball catcher and outfielder during the 1870s.

Early life
Quinn was born in Chicago in 1849, the son of police officer James Quinn, who was killed in the line of duty in 1853. Quinn played for the amateur club Aetna of Chicago beginning in 1869, at the dawn of the professional era.

Professional career
Quinn's first professional experience was as a catcher in five games for the 1871 Fort Wayne Kekiongas of the National Association. He hit .235 with an on-base percentage of .381, scored eight runs, drove in two, and stole three bases.

Quinn returned to professional baseball in 1875, primarily as a catcher. He led the Keokuk Westerns in batting average (.326) with 14 hits, playing 11 of the 13 games the club completed before it went out of business. He moved on to Hartford and Chicago, playing 33 games in total and batting .265.

In 1876, after the formation of the National League, Quinn declined an offer to catch for the Cincinnati Reds.

In 1877, Quinn returned to the Chicago White Stockings and played four games in the outfield. He recorded one hit in 14 at-bats.

Death
Quinn died at age 59 from unknown causes in his native Chicago in 1909.

References

External links

1849 births
1909 deaths
19th-century baseball players
Chicago White Stockings players
Fort Wayne Kekiongas players
Hartford Dark Blues players
Keokuk Westerns players
Major League Baseball catchers
Baseball players from Chicago